Frank Mann may refer to:
Frank Mann (cricketer) (1888–1964), English cricketer
Frank Mann (engineer) (1908–1992), aeronautical and aerospace engineer
Frank Mann (footballer) (1891–1966), English football player
Frank E. Mann (1920–2007), American politician from the state of Virginia
Franklin B. Mann (born 1941), American politician
Franklin Ware Mann (1856–1916), American inventor and ballistics scientist